Oberea inclusa is a species of beetle in the family Cerambycidae. It was described by Francis Polkinghorne Pascoe in 1858. It contains the varietas Oberea inclusa var. discipennis.

References

inclusa
Beetles described in 1858